The  commonly shortened to the Famicom Disk System or just Disk System, is a peripheral for Nintendo's Family Computer home video game console, released only in Japan on February 21, 1986. It uses proprietary floppy disks called "Disk Cards" for cheaper data storage and it adds a new high-fidelity sound channel for supporting Disk System games.

Fundamentally, the Disk System serves simply to enhance some aspects already inherent to the base Famicom system, with better sound and cheaper gamesthough with the disadvantages of high initial price, slow speed, and lower reliability. However, this boost to the market of affordable and writable mass storage temporarily served as an enabling technology for the creation of new types of video games. This includes the vast, open world, progress-saving adventures of the best-selling The Legend of Zelda (1986) and Metroid (1986), games with a cost-effective and swift release such as the best-selling Super Mario Bros. 2, and nationwide leaderboards and contests via the in-store Disk Fax kiosks, which are considered to be forerunners of today's online achievement and distribution systems.

By 1989, the Famicom Disk System was inevitably obsoleted by the improving semiconductor technology of game cartridges. The Disk System's lifetime sales reached 4.4 million units by 1990, making it the most successful console add-on of all time, despite not being sold outside of Japan. Its final game was released in 1992, its software was discontinued in 2003, and Nintendo officially discontinued its technical support in 2007.

History
By 1985, Nintendo's Family Computer was dominating the Japanese home video game market, selling over three million units within a year and a half. Because of its success, the company had difficulty with keeping up demand for new stock, often getting flooded with calls from retailers asking for more systems. Retailers also requested for cheaper games; the cost of chips and semiconductors made cartridges expensive to make, and often cost a lot of money for both stores and consumers to purchase. Chip shortages also created supply issues. To satisfy these requests, Nintendo began thinking of ways to potentially lower the cost of games. It turned towards the home computer market for inspiration; Nintendo specifically looked to floppy disks which were quickly becoming the standard for storage media for personal computers. Floppy disks were cheap to produce and rewritable, allowing games to be easily produced during the manufacturing process. Seeing its potential, Nintendo began work on a disk-based peripheral for the Famicom.

For its proprietary diskette platform, which they dubbed the "Disk Card", Nintendo chose to base it on Mitsumi's Quick Disk media format, a cheaper alternative to floppy disks for Japanese home computers. The Disk Card format presented a number of advantages over cartridges, such as increased storage capacity that allowed for larger games, additional sound channels, and the ability to save player progress. The add-on itself was produced by Masayuki Uemura and Nintendo Research & Development 2, the same team that designed the Famicom itself. Following several delays, the Famicom Disk System was released on February 21, 1986, at a retail price of ¥15000 (US$80). The same day, Nintendo released The Legend of Zelda as a launch title, alongside disk re-releases of earlier Famicom games. Marketing material for the Disk System featured a yellow mascot character named Diskun, or Mr. Disk. The Famicom Disk System sold over 300,000 units within three months, jumping to over 2 million by the end of the year. Nintendo remained confident the Disk System would be a sure-fire success, and ensured that all future first-party releases would be exclusive to the peripheral.

Coinciding with the Disk System's release, Nintendo installed several "Disk Writer" kiosks in various toy and electronic stores across the country. These kiosks allowed customers to bring in their disk games and have a new game rewritten onto them for a ¥500 fee; blank disks could also be purchased for ¥2000. Nintendo also introduced special high-score tournaments for specific Disk System games, where players could submit their scores directly to Nintendo via "Disk Fax" machines found in retail stores. Winners would receive exclusive prizes, including Famicom-branded stationary sets and a gold-colored Punch-Out!! cartridge. Nintendo of America announced plans to release the Disk System for the Famicom's international counterpart, the Nintendo Entertainment System, however these plans were eventually scrapped.

Despite the Famicom Disk System's success and advantages over the Famicom itself, it also imposed many problems of its own. Most common was the quality of the Disk Cards; Nintendo removed the shutters on most Disk System games to reduce costs, instead placing them in a wax sleeve and clear plastic shell. The disks themselves are fragile, and the lack of a shutter made them collect dust and fingerprints, eventually rendering them unplayable as a result. Piracy was also rampant, with disk copying devices and bootleg games becoming commonplace in stores and in magazine advertisements. Third-party developers for the Disk System were also angered towards Nintendo's strict licensing terms, requiring that it receive 50% copyright ownership of any and all software released — this led to several major developers, such as Namco and Hudson Soft, refusing to produce games for it. Four months after the Disk System was released, Capcom released a Famicom conversion of Ghosts 'n Goblins on a 128k cartridge - larger than the Disk Card's 112k capacity - which, as a result, made consumers and developers less impressed with the Disk System's technological features. Retailers disliked the Disk Writer kiosks for taking up too much space and for generally being unprofitable. The Disk System's vague error messages, long loading times, and the poor quality of the rubber drive belt that spun the disks are also cited as attributing to its downfall.

By 1989, advancements in technology made cartridge games much cheaper and easier to produce, leaving the Famicom Disk System obsolete. Retailers were critical of Nintendo simply abandoning the Disk Writers and leaving stores with large kiosks that took up vital space, while companies began to release or move their games from the Disk System to a standard cartridge; towards the end of development, Squaresoft ported Final Fantasy over to the Famicom as a cartridge game, with its own battery backup save feature. Nintendo officially discontinued the Famicom Disk System in 1990, selling around 4.4 million units total. Disk writing services were still kept in operation until 2003, while technical services were serviced up until 2007.

Hardware versions

Sharp released the Twin Famicom, a Famicom model that features a built-in Disk System.

Disk Writer and Disk Fax kiosks
Widespread copyright violation in Japan's predominantly personal-computer-based game rental market inspired corporations to petition the government to ban the rental of all video games in 1984. With games then being available only via full purchase, demand rose for a new and less expensive way to access more games. In 1986, as video gaming had increasingly expanded from computers into the video game console market, Nintendo advertised a promise to install 10,000 Famicom Disk Writer kiosks in toy and hobby stores across Japan within one year. These jukebox style stations allowed users to copy from a rotating stock of the latest games to their disks and keep each one for an unlimited time. Some game releases, such as Kaette Kita Mario Bros., were exclusive to these kiosks.

In 1987, Disk Writer kiosks in select locations were also provisioned as Disk Fax systems as Nintendo's first online concept. Players could take advantage of the dynamic rewritability of blue floppy disk versions of Disk System games (such as Famicom Grand Prix: F1 Race and Golf Japan Course) in order to save their high scores at their leisure at home, and then bring the disk to a retailer's Disk Fax kiosk, which collated and transmitted the players' scores via fax to Nintendo. Players participated in a nationwide leaderboard, with unique prizes.

The kiosk service was very popular and remained available until 2003. In subsequent console generations, Nintendo would relaunch this online national leaderboard concept with the home satellite-based Satellaview subscription service in Japan from 1995-2000 for the Super Famicom. It would relaunch the model of games downloadable to rewritable portable media from store kiosks, with the Nintendo Power service in Japan which is based on rewritable flash media cartridges for the Super Famicom and Game Boy from 1997–2007.

Calling the Disk Writer "one of the coolest things Nintendo ever created", Kotaku says modern "digital distribution could learn from [Disk Writer]", and that the system's premise of game rental and achievements would still be innovative in today's retail and online stores. NintendoLife said it "was truly ground-breaking for its time and could be considered a forerunner of more modern distribution methods [such as] Xbox Live Arcade, PlayStation Network, and Steam".

Technology
The device is connected to the Famicom console by plugging its RAM Adapter cartridge into the system's cartridge port, and attaching that cartridge's cable to the disk drive. The RAM Adapter contains 32 kilobytes (KB) of RAM for temporarily caching program data from disk, 8 KB of RAM for tile and sprite data storage, and an ASIC named the 2C33. The ASIC acts as a disk controller, plus single-cycle wavetable-lookup synthesizer sound hardware. Finally, embedded in the 2C33 is an 8KB BIOS ROM.  The Disk Cards used are double-sided, with a total capacity of 112 KB per disk. Many games span both sides of a disk and a few span multiple disks, requiring the user to switch at some point during gameplay. The Disk System is capable of running on six C-cell batteries or the supplied AC adapter. Batteries usually last five months with daily game play. The inclusion of a battery option is due to the likelihood of a standard set of AC plugs already being occupied by a Famicom and a television.

The Disk System's Disk Cards are somewhat proprietary 71 mm × 76 mm (2.8 × 3 in) 56K-per-side double-sided floppy. They are a slight modification of Mitsumi's Quick Disk 71 mm 2.8 in square disk format which is used in a handful of Japanese computers and various synthesizer keyboards, along with a few word processors. QuickDisk drives are in a few devices in Europe and North America. Mitsumi already had close relations with Nintendo, as it manufactured the Famicom and NES consoles, and possibly other Nintendo hardware.

Modifications to the standard Quick Disk format include the "NINTENDO" moulding along the bottom of each Disk Card. In addition to branding the disk, this acts as a rudimentary form of copy protection - a device inside the drive bay contains raised protrusions which fit into their recessed counterparts, ostensibly ensuring that only official disks are used. If a disk without these recessed areas is inserted, the protrusions cannot raise, and the system will not allow the game to be loaded. This was combined with technical measures in the way data was stored on the disk to prevent users from physically swapping copied disk media into an official shell. However, both of these measures were defeated by pirate game distributors; in particular, special disks with cutouts alongside simple devices to modify standard Quick Disks were produced to defeat the physical hardware check, enabling rampant piracy. An advertisement containing a guide for a simple modification to a Quick Disk to allow its use with a Famicom Disk System was printed in at least one magazine.

Games

There are about 200 games in the Famicom Disk System's library. Some are FDS exclusives, some are Disk Writer exclusives, and many were re-released years later on the cartridge format such as The Legend of Zelda for NES in 1987 and for Famicom in 1994. The most notable FDS originals include The Legend of Zelda, Zelda II: The Adventure of Link, Kid Icarus, Metroid, and Akumajō Dracula (Castlevania).

Square Co., Ltd. had a branch called Disk Original Group, a software label that published Disk System games from Japanese PC software companies. The venture was largely a failure and almost pushed a pre-Final Fantasy Square into bankruptcy. Final Fantasy was to be released for the FDS, but a disagreement over Nintendo's copyright policies caused Square to change its position and release the game as a cartridge.

Nintendo released a disk version of Super Mario Bros. in addition to the cartridge version. The Western-market Super Mario Bros. 2 originated from a disk-only game called Yume Kōjō: Doki Doki Panic.

Nintendo utilized the cheaper and more dynamic disk medium for a Disk Writer exclusive, as an early advergame. Kaettekita Mario Bros. (lit. The Return of Mario Bros.) is a remastered version of Mario Bros. with enhanced jump controls and high score saving, plus a new slot machine minigame co-branded for the Nagatanien food company.

The final FDS game release was Janken Disk Jō in December 1992, a rock paper scissors game featuring the Disk System mascot, Disk-kun.

Legacy
The Famicom Disk System briefly served as an enabling technology for the creation of a new wave of home console video games and a new type of video game experience, mostly due to tripling the size of cheap game storage compared to affordable cartridge ROMs, and by storing gamers' progress within their vast new adventures. These games include the open world design and enduring series launches of The Legend of Zelda (1986) and Metroid (1986), with its launch game Zelda becoming very popular and leading to sequels which are considered some of the greatest games of all time. Almost one decade ahead of Nintendo's Satellaview service, the FDS's writable and portable storage technology served as an enabling technology for the innovation of online leaderboards and contests via the in-store Disk Fax kiosks, which are now seen as the earliest forerunners of modern online gaming and distribution.

Within its library of 200 original games, some are FDS-exclusive and many were re-released one or two years later on cartridges for Famicom and NES, though without the FDS's additional sound channel.

See also
Sega CD - A similar peripheral for the Sega Genesis.
64DD

Notes

References

Nintendo Entertainment System accessories
Video game console add-ons
Video game storage media
Japan-only video game hardware
Computer-related introductions in 1986